G. O. Smith (1872–1943) is British amateur footballer.

Gilbert Smith may also refer to:

Gilbert Morgan Smith (1885–1959), American botanist
Gilbert Smith (footballer, born 1869) (1869–?), British professional footballer
Gilbert E. Smith (1904–?), American college football player and coach
Gilbert C. Smith, state legislator from Mississippi
Gilbert F. Smith, state legislator from Idaho